= Rotameter (railway) =

Railway machine

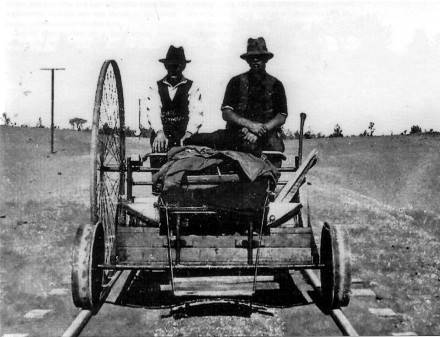
NSWGR Rotameter

The New South Wales Government Railways constructed in 1903 a device for measuring the length of its lines of railway. That authority named the machine a Rotameter. It consisted of a four-wheel trolley with an additional large fifth wheel which traveled along the running surface of the rail. Its last recorded use was in the 1920s.
